Yaqubabad (also Romanized as Ya‘qūbābād; also known as ‘Āshūrī  and Ya‘qūb Shāh) is a village in Kamal Rud Rural District, Qolqol Rud District, Tuyserkan County, Hamadan Province, Iran. At the 2006 census, its population was 152, in 49 families.

References 

Populated places in Tuyserkan County